{{DISPLAYTITLE:C5H6O3}}
The molecular formula C5H6O3 (molar mass: 114.10 g/mol, exact mass: 114.0317 u) may refer to:

 2-Oxopent-4-enoic acid (2-oxopent-4-enoate)
 2,3,4-Pentanetrione, the simplest linear triketone